Luxi County is located in Honghe Hani and Yi Autonomous Prefecture, Yunnan province, China. Luxi was the capital of the medieval Yi Ziqi Kingdom.

Administrative divisions
In the present, Luxi County has 5 towns and 3 townships. 
5 towns

3 townships
 Xiangyang
 Santang
 Yongning

Ethnic groups
There are five ethnic Yi subgroups in Luxi County, namely White Yi 白彝, Sani 撒尼, Black Yi 黑彝, Awu 阿乌, and Dry Yi 干彝, with the Dry Yi living mostly in Xiaobai Shitou 小白石头 and Baishui Wunaibai 白水吾乃白 of Jinma Town 金马镇.

Climate

References

External links
Luxi County

 
County-level divisions of Honghe Prefecture